Ali Ahmad Yarzada (born 15 October 1985) is an Afghan footballer. He is also Afghanistan national football team player. He has more than 20 caps for national team. He wears number 5 and his main position is centre back.

Honours

Afghanistan
SAFF Championship: 2013

References

External links

Living people
Afghan footballers
Afghanistan international footballers
1985 births
Association football defenders